This is a list of town tramway systems in Switzerland.  It includes all tram systems, past and present. Cities with currently operating systems, and those systems themselves, are indicated in bold and blue background colored rows. Those tram systems that operated on other than standard gauge track (where known) are indicated in the 'Notes' column.


See also

 Riffelalptram
 List of town tramway systems in Europe
 List of tram and light rail transit systems
 List of metro systems
 List of trolleybus systems in Switzerland

References

Bibliography

External links

Tramways
Switzerland